Bull Run is a historical novel for children by  Paul Fleischman, published in 1993. It consists of sixteen monologues by participants in the First Battle of Bull Run in 1861. The novel has won several awards.

Summary
This historical fiction novel, written by Paul Fleischman, highlights the events surrounding the first major battle of the American Civil War, the Battle of Bull Run.  It is told through the first-person perspectives of 16 different characters, both Union and Confederate.   .

Characters
Northerners:Lily Malloy, Gideon Adams, Dietrich Herz, James Dacy, Nathaniel Epp, General Irvin McDowell, A.B. Tilbury, Edmund Upwing, and Carlotta King.

Southerners: Colonel Oliver Brattle, Shem Suggs, Toby Boyce, Virgil Peavy, Judah Jenkins, Dr. William Rye, and Flora Wheelworth.

Awards
Bull Run won several awards, including the 2012 Scott O'Dell Award for Historical Fiction, and was named a Best Book by the School Library Journal, a Notable Children's Books by the American Library Association, and a Notable Children's Books in the Language Arts by the National Council of Teachers of English.

External links

Paul Fleischman's Official Website

Children's historical novels
1993 American novels
Novels set during the American Civil War
Fiction set in 1861
Novels by Paul Fleischman
1993 children's books
American children's novels